Nordstromia angula is a moth in the family Drepanidae. It was described by Hong-Fu Chu and Lin-Yao Wang in 1988. It is found in Fujian, China.

Adults resemble Nordstromia fusca, but can be distinguished by the greyish-brown body and wing colour with faint markings. The outer area of the forewings is convex and angulate.

References

Moths described in 1988
Drepaninae
Moths of Asia